Fiorenzo Serra (3 May 1921, in Porto Torres – 28 September 2005, in Sassari) was an Italian film director and documentarist.

He produced 66 movies and documentaries, mainly based on Sardinia's ethnographic, social and cultural themes.

He  wins the Agis Prize for the documentary L'Ultimo Pugno di Terra in 1966, realised together the novelist Giuseppe Dessì and the future Italian minister Giuseppe Pisanu, with the supervision of the screenwriter Cesare Zavattini.

Bibliography
AA.VV., L'ultimo pugno di terra. Il film di Fiorenzo Serra sulla Rinascita, Filmpraxis - Quaderni della Cineteca Sarda n. 6, ed. Maestrale, Nuoro, 2014.
Giulio Angioni, Manlio Brigaglia et Alii, Fiorenzo Serra: la mia terra è un'isola, Nuoro, Ilisso, 2010

Legacy
The "Fiorenzo Serra" Visual Anthropology Laboratory of the Società Umanitaria-Cineteca Sarda, with the collaboration of the History Department of University of Sassari, annually organises Fiorenzo Serra Film Festival.

External links
 http://www.sardegnadigitallibrary.it/index.php?xsl=602&s=17&v=9&c=4460&c1=Fiorenzo+Serra&n=24&ric=1 Fiorenzo Serra's documentaries web archive

References

1921 births
2005 deaths
Italian film directors
Italian documentary film directors